This is a list of the bird species recorded in São Tomé and Príncipe. As São Tomé and Príncipe is a series of islands, its avifauna grows whenever a "new" species arrives or is recorded for the first time; the list comprises 175 species, of which 25 are endemic, 4 have been introduced by humans, and several are rare or accidental (often termed "vagrants"). 

This list's taxonomic treatment (designation and sequence of orders, families and species) and nomenclature (common and scientific names) for the most part follow the conventions of The Clements Checklist of Birds of the World, 2022 edition. The family accounts at the beginning of each heading reflect this taxonomy, as do the species counts found in each family account. Introduced and accidental species are included in the total counts for São Tomé and Príncipe.

The following tags have been used to highlight several categories, but not all species fall into one of these categories. Those that do not are commonly occurring native species.

(A) Accidental - a species that rarely or accidentally occurs in São Tomé and Príncipe
(E) Endemic - a species endemic to São Tomé and Príncipe
(I) Introduced - a species introduced to São Tomé and Príncipe as a consequence, direct or indirect, of human actions

Ducks, geese, and waterfowl
Order: AnseriformesFamily: Anatidae

Anatidae includes the ducks and most duck-like waterfowl, such as geese and swans. These birds are adapted to an aquatic existence with webbed feet, flattened bills, and feathers that are excellent at shedding water due to an oily coating.

Fulvous whistling-duck, Dendrocygna bicolor
Knob-billed duck, Sarkidiornis melanotos
African pygmy-goose, Nettapus auritus (A)

Guineafowl
Order: GalliformesFamily: Numididae

Guineafowl are a group of African, seed-eating, ground-nesting birds that resemble partridges, but with featherless heads and spangled grey plumage. 

Helmeted guineafowl, Numida meleagris

Pheasants, grouse, and allies
Order: GalliformesFamily: Phasianidae

The Phasianidae are a family of terrestrial birds which consists of quails, partridges, snowcocks, francolins, spurfowls, tragopans, monals, pheasants, peafowls and jungle fowls. In general, they are plump (although they vary in size) and have broad, relatively short wings. 

Harlequin quail, Coturnix delegorguei
Scaly francolin, Pternistis squamatus
Red-necked spurfowl, Pternistis afer

Flamingos
Order: PhoenicopteriformesFamily: Phoenicopteridae

Flamingos filter-feed on shellfish and algae. Their oddly-shaped beaks are specially adapted to separate mud and silt from the food they consume and, uniquely, are used upside-down. There are 6 species worldwide and 1 or 2 species which occur in São Tomé and Príncipe.

Greater flamingo, Phoenicopterus roseus 
Lesser flamingo, Phoenicopterus minor

Pigeons and doves
Order: ColumbiformesFamily: Columbidae

Pigeons and doves are stout-bodied birds with short necks and short slender bills with a fleshy cere.

Rock pigeon, Columba livia
Rameron pigeon, Columba arquatrix
Maroon pigeon, Columba thomensis (E)
São Tomé pigeon, Columba malherbii 
Lemon dove, Columba larvata
Laughing dove, Streptopelia senegalensis
São Tomé green-pigeon, Treron sanctithomae (E)
African green-pigeon, Treron calva

Cuckoos
Order: CuculiformesFamily: Cuculidae

The family Cuculidae includes cuckoos, roadrunners and anis. These birds are of variable size with slender bodies, long tails and strong legs. The Old World cuckoos are brood parasites.

Great spotted cuckoo, Clamator glandarius
Pied cuckoo, Clamator jacobinus
Klaas's cuckoo, Chrysococcyx klaas 
African emerald cuckoo, Chrysococcyx cupreus
Common cuckoo, Cuculus canorus

Swifts
Order: CaprimulgiformesFamily: Apodidae

Swifts are small birds which spend the majority of their lives flying. These birds have very short legs and never settle voluntarily on the ground, perching instead only on vertical surfaces. Many swifts have long swept-back wings which resemble a crescent or boomerang. 

São Tomé spinetail, Zoonavena thomensis (E)
Common swift, Apus apus (A)
Pallid swift, Apus pallidus (A)
Little swift, Apus affinis
African palm-swift, Cypsiurus parvus

Rails, gallinules, and coots
Order: GruiformesFamily: Rallidae

Rallidae is a large family of small to medium-sized birds which includes the rails, crakes, coots and gallinules. Typically they inhabit dense vegetation in damp environments near lakes, swamps or rivers. In general they are shy and secretive birds, making them difficult to observe. Most species have strong legs and long toes which are well adapted to soft uneven surfaces. They tend to have short, rounded wings and to be weak fliers.

African rail, Rallus caerulescens
African crake, Crex egregia
Lesser moorhen, Paragallinula angulata
Eurasian moorhen, Gallinula chloropus
Allen's gallinule, Porphyrio alleni (A)

Thick-knees
Order: CharadriiformesFamily: Burhinidae

The thick-knees are a group of largely tropical waders in the family Burhinidae. They are found worldwide within the tropical zone, with some species also breeding in temperate Europe and Australia. They are medium to large waders with strong black or yellow-black bills, large yellow eyes and cryptic plumage. Despite being classed as waders, most species have a preference for arid or semi-arid habitats.

Eurasian thick-knee, Burhinus oedicnemus (A)

Plovers and lapwings
Order: CharadriiformesFamily: Charadriidae

The family Charadriidae includes the plovers, dotterels and lapwings. They are small to medium-sized birds with compact bodies, short, thick necks and long, usually pointed, wings. They are found in open country worldwide, mostly in habitats near water.

Black-bellied plover, Pluvialis squatarola
European golden-plover, Pluvialis apricaria 
American golden-plover, Pluvialis dominica 
Spur-winged lapwing, Vanellus spinosus (A)
Common ringed plover, Charadrius hiaticula (A)
Little ringed plover, Charadrius dubius 
White-fronted plover, Charadrius marginatus

Sandpipers and allies
Order: CharadriiformesFamily: Scolopacidae

Scolopacidae is a large diverse family of small to medium-sized shorebirds including the sandpipers, curlews, godwits, shanks, tattlers, woodcocks, snipes, dowitchers and phalaropes. The majority of these species eat small invertebrates picked out of the mud or soil. Variation in length of legs and bills enables multiple species to feed in the same habitat, particularly on the coast, without direct competition for food.

Whimbrel, Numenius phaeopus
Eurasian curlew, Numenius arquata
Bar-tailed godwit, Limosa lapponica
Ruddy turnstone, Arenaria interpres
Red knot, Calidris canutus (A)
Ruff, Calidris pugnax (A)
Curlew sandpiper, Calidris ferruginea
Sanderling, Calidris alba (A)
Little stint, Calidris minuta
Pectoral sandpiper, Calidris melanotos 
Common sandpiper, Actitis hypoleucos
Green sandpiper, Tringa ochropus
Common greenshank, Tringa nebularia
Marsh sandpiper, Tringa stagnatilis
Wood sandpiper, Tringa glareola

Pratincoles and coursers
Order: CharadriiformesFamily: Glareolidae

Glareolidae is a family of wading birds comprising the pratincoles, which have short legs, long pointed wings and long forked tails, and the coursers, which have long legs, short wings and long pointed bills which curve downwards.

Black-winged pratincole, Glareola nordmanni

Skuas and jaegers
Order: CharadriiformesFamily: Stercorariidae

The family Stercorariidae are, in general, medium to large birds, typically with grey or brown plumage, often with white markings on the wings. They nest on the ground in temperate and arctic regions and are long-distance migrants.

Pomarine jaeger, Stercorarius pomarinus
Parasitic jaeger, Stercorarius parasiticus (A)

Gulls, terns, and skimmers
Order: CharadriiformesFamily: Laridae

Laridae is a family of medium to large seabirds, the gulls, terns, and skimmers. Gulls are typically grey or white, often with black markings on the head or wings. They have stout, longish bills and webbed feet. Terns are a group of generally medium to large seabirds typically with grey or white plumage, often with black markings on the head. Most terns hunt fish by diving but some pick insects off the surface of fresh water. Terns are generally long-lived birds, with several species known to live in excess of 30 years.

Sabine's gull, Xema sabini (A)
Brown noddy, Anous stolidus
Black noddy, Anous minutus
Sooty tern, Onychoprion fuscatus
Bridled tern, Onychoprion anaethetus
Black tern, Chlidonias niger  (A)
White-winged tern, Chlidonias leucopterus
Arctic tern, Sterna paradisaea (A)
Sandwich tern, Thalasseus sandvicensis
West African crested tern, Thalasseus albididorsalis (A)

Tropicbirds
Order: PhaethontiformesFamily: Phaethontidae

Tropicbirds are slender white birds of tropical oceans, with exceptionally long central tail feathers. Their heads and long wings have black markings.

White-tailed tropicbird, Phaethon lepturus
Red-billed tropicbird, Phaethon aethereus (A)

Southern storm-petrels
Order: ProcellariiformesFamily: Oceanitidae

The southern storm-petrels are relatives of the petrels and are the smallest seabirds. They feed on planktonic crustaceans and small fish picked from the surface, typically while hovering. The flight is fluttering and sometimes bat-like. 

Wilson's storm-petrel, Oceanites oceanicus

Northern storm-petrels
Order: ProcellariiformesFamily: Hydrobatidae

Though the members of this family are similar in many respects to the southern storm-petrels, including their general appearance and habits, there are enough genetic differences to warrant their placement in a separate family.

European storm-petrel, Hydrobates pelagicus
Band-rumped storm-petrel, Hydrobates castro

Shearwaters and petrels
Order: ProcellariiformesFamily: Procellariidae

The procellariids are the main group of medium-sized "true petrels", characterised by united nostrils with medium septum and a long outer functional primary.

Cory's shearwater, Calonectris diomedea (A)
Great shearwater, Ardenna gravis
Sooty shearwater, Ardenna griseus

Storks
Order: CiconiiformesFamily: Ciconiidae

Storks are large, long-legged, long-necked, wading birds with long, stout bills. Storks are mute, but bill-clattering is an important mode of communication at the nest. Their nests can be large and may be reused for many years. Many species are migratory.

White stork, Ciconia ciconia
Yellow-billed stork, Mycteria ibis (A)

Frigatebirds
Order: SuliformesFamily: Fregatidae

Frigatebirds are large seabirds usually found over tropical oceans. They are large, black-and-white, or completely black, with long wings and deeply forked tails. The males have colored inflatable throat pouches. They do not swim or walk and cannot take off from a flat surface. Having the largest wingspan-to-body-weight ratio of any bird, they are essentially aerial, able to stay aloft for more than a week.

Magnificent frigatebird, Fregata magnificens (A)

Boobies and gannets
Order: SuliformesFamily: Sulidae

The sulids comprise the gannets and boobies. Both groups are medium to large coastal seabirds that plunge-dive for fish.

Masked booby, Sula dactylatra 
Brown booby, Sula leucogaster
Red-footed booby, Sula sula (A)
Cape gannet, Morus capensis

Cormorants and shags
Order: SuliformesFamily: Phalacrocoracidae

Phalacrocoracidae is a family of medium to large coastal, fish-eating seabirds that includes cormorants and shags. Plumage colouration varies, with the majority having mainly dark plumage, some species being black-and-white and a few being colourful.

Long-tailed cormorant, Microcarbo africanus

Herons, egrets, and bitterns
Order: PelecaniformesFamily: Ardeidae

The family Ardeidae contains the bitterns, herons and egrets. Herons and egrets are medium to large wading birds with long necks and legs. Bitterns tend to be shorter necked and more wary. Members of Ardeidae fly with their necks retracted, unlike other long-necked birds such as storks, ibises and spoonbills.

Little bittern, Ixobrychus minutus
Gray heron, Ardea cinerea
Black-headed heron, Ardea melanocephala (A) 
Purple heron, Ardea purpurea
Great egret, Ardea alba (A) 
Intermediate egret, Ardea intermedia (A) 
Little egret, Egretta garzetta 
Western reef-heron, Egretta gularis
Black heron, Egretta ardesiaca
Cattle egret, Bubulcus ibis
Squacco heron, Ardeola ralloides (A) 
Striated heron, Butorides striata

Ibises and spoonbills
Order: PelecaniformesFamily: Threskiornithidae

Threskiornithidae is a family of large terrestrial and wading birds which includes the ibises and spoonbills. They have long, broad wings with 11 primary and about 20 secondary feathers. They are strong fliers and despite their size and weight, very capable soarers.

Olive ibis, Bostrychia olivacea
São Tomé ibis, Bostrychia bocagei (E)

Osprey
Order: AccipitriformesFamily: Pandionidae

The family Pandionidae contains only one species, the osprey. The osprey is a medium-large raptor which is a specialist fish-eater with a worldwide distribution.

Osprey, Pandion haliaetus

Hawks, eagles, and kites
Order: AccipitriformesFamily: Accipitridae

Accipitridae is a family of birds of prey, which includes hawks, eagles, kites, harriers and Old World vultures. These birds have powerful hooked beaks for tearing flesh from their prey, strong legs, powerful talons and keen eyesight.

Palm-nut vulture, Gypohierax angolensis
White-backed vulture, Gyps africanus (A)
Black kite, Milvus migrans

Barn-owls
Order: StrigiformesFamily: Tytonidae

Barn-owls are medium to large owls with large heads and characteristic heart-shaped faces. They have long strong legs with powerful talons. 

Barn owl, Tyto alba

Owls
Order: StrigiformesFamily: Strigidae

The typical owls are small to large solitary nocturnal birds of prey. They have large forward-facing eyes and ears, a hawk-like beak and a conspicuous circle of feathers around each eye called a facial disk.

São Tomé scops-owl, Otus hartlaubi (E)
African scops-owl, Otus senegalensis

Kingfishers
Order: CoraciiformesFamily: Alcedinidae

Kingfishers are medium-sized birds with large heads, long pointed bills, short legs and stubby tails.

Malachite kingfisher, Corythornis cristatus
Príncipe kingfisher, Corythornis cristatus nais (E)
São Tomé kingfisher, Corythornis cristatus thomensis (E)
White-bellied kingfisher, Corythornis leucogaster
Blue-breasted kingfisher, Halcyon malimbica
Pied kingfisher, Ceryle rudis

Rollers
Order: CoraciiformesFamily: Coraciidae

Rollers resemble crows in size and build, but are more closely related to the kingfishers and bee-eaters. They share the colourful appearance of those groups with blues and browns predominating. The two inner front toes are connected, but the outer toe is not.

European roller, Coracias garrulus
Broad-billed roller, Eurystomus glaucurus (A)

Falcons and caracaras
Order: FalconiformesFamily: Falconidae

Falconidae is a family of diurnal birds of prey. They differ from hawks, eagles and kites in that they kill with their beaks instead of their talons.

Red-footed falcon, Falco vespertinus
Eurasian hobby, Falco subbuteo (A)
Lanner falcon, Falco biarmicus (A)

Old World parrots
Order: PsittaciformesFamily: Psittaculidae

Characteristic features of parrots include a strong curved bill, an upright stance, strong legs, and clawed zygodactyl feet. Many parrots are vividly colored, and some are multi-colored. Old World parrots are found from Africa east across south and southeast Asia and Oceania to Australia and New Zealand.

Red-headed lovebird, Agapornis pullarius

New World and African parrots
Order: PsittaciformesFamily: Psittacidae

Most of the more than 150 species in this family are found in the New World.

Gray parrot, Psittacus erithacus

Old World orioles
Order: PasseriformesFamily: Oriolidae

The Old World orioles are colourful passerine birds. They are not related to the New World orioles.

Eurasian golden oriole, Oriolus oriolus (A)
São Tomé oriole, Oriolus crassirostris (E)

Drongos
Order: PasseriformesFamily: Dicruridae

The drongos are mostly black or dark grey in colour, sometimes with metallic tints. They have long forked tails, and some Asian species have elaborate tail decorations. They have short legs and sit very upright when perched, like a shrike. They flycatch or take prey from the ground.

Velvet-mantled drongo, Dicrurus modestus

Monarch flycatchers
Order: PasseriformesFamily: Monarchidae

The monarch flycatchers are small to medium-sized insectivorous passerines which hunt by flycatching.

São Tomé paradise-flycatcher, Terpsiphone atrochalybeia (E)
Black-headed paradise-flycatcher, Terpsiphone rufiventer

Shrikes
Order: PasseriformesFamily: Laniidae

Shrikes are passerine birds known for their habit of catching other birds and small animals and impaling the uneaten portions of their bodies on thorns. A typical shrike's beak is hooked, like a bird of prey. 

Lesser gray shrike, Lanius minor
Newton's fiscal, Lanius newtoni (E)

Cisticolas and allies
Order: PasseriformesFamily: Cisticolidae

The Cisticolidae are warblers found mainly in warmer southern regions of the Old World. They are generally very small birds of drab brown or grey appearance found in open country such as grassland or scrub. 

São Tomé prinia, Prinia molleri (E)

Swallows
Order: PasseriformesFamily: Hirundinidae

The family Hirundinidae is adapted to aerial feeding. They have a slender streamlined body, long pointed wings and a short bill with a wide gape. The feet are adapted to perching rather than walking, and the front toes are partially joined at the base. 

Bank swallow, Riparia riparia (A)
Banded martin, Neophedina cincta
Barn swallow, Hirundo rustica
Common house-martin, Delichon urbica
Gray-rumped swallow, Pseudhirundo griseopyga (A)

Leaf warblers
Order: PasseriformesFamily: Phylloscopidae

Leaf warblers are a family of small insectivorous birds found mostly in Eurasia and ranging into Wallacea and Africa. The species are of various sizes, often green-plumaged above and yellow below, or more subdued with grayish-green to grayish-brown colors.

Willow warbler, Phylloscopus trochilus (A)

Sylviid warblers, parrotbills, and allies
Order: PasseriformesFamily: Sylviidae

The family Sylviidae is a group of small insectivorous passerine birds. They mainly occur as breeding species, as the common name implies, in Europe, Asia and, to a lesser extent, Africa. Most are of generally undistinguished appearance, but many have distinctive songs.

Garden warbler, Sylvia borin (A)
Dohrn's thrush-babbler, Sylvia dohrni

White-eyes, yuhinas, and allies
Order: PasseriformesFamily: Zosteropidae

The white-eyes are small and mostly undistinguished, their plumage above being generally some dull colour like greenish-olive, but some species have a white or bright yellow throat, breast or lower parts, and several have buff flanks. As their name suggests, many species have a white ring around each eye. 

Principe white-eye, Zosterops ficedulinus (E)
São Tomé white-eye, Zosterops feae (E)
Black-capped speirops, Speirops lugubris (E)
Príncipe speirops, Speirops leucophoeus (E)

Starlings
Order: PasseriformesFamily: Sturnidae

Starlings are small to medium-sized passerine birds. Their flight is strong and direct and they are very gregarious. Their preferred habitat is fairly open country. They eat insects and fruit. Plumage is typically dark with a metallic sheen.

Chestnut-winged starling, Onychognathus fulgidus
Splendid starling, Lamprotornis splendidus
Principe starling, Lamprotornis ornatus (E)

Thrushes and allies
Order: PasseriformesFamily: Turdidae

The thrushes are a group of passerine birds that occur mainly in the Old World. They are plump, soft plumaged, small to medium-sized insectivores or sometimes omnivores, often feeding on the ground. Many have attractive songs.

Príncipe thrush, Turdus xanthorhynchus (E)
São Tomé thrush, Turdus olivaceofuscus (E)

Old World flycatchers
Order: PasseriformesFamily: Muscicapidae

Old World flycatchers are a large group of small passerine birds native to the Old World. They are mainly small arboreal insectivores. The appearance of these birds is highly varied, but they mostly have weak songs and harsh calls.

Spotted flycatcher, Muscicapa striata
Common nightingale, Luscinia megarhynchos (A) 
Collared flycatcher, Ficedula albicollis (A)
Whinchat, Saxicola rubetra (A)

Sunbirds and spiderhunters
Order: PasseriformesFamily: Nectariniidae

The sunbirds and spiderhunters are very small passerine birds which feed largely on nectar, although they will also take insects, especially when feeding young. Flight is fast and direct on their short wings. Most species can take nectar by hovering like a hummingbird, but usually perch to feed. 

Príncipe sunbird, Anabathmis hartlaubii (E)
Newton's sunbird, Anabathmis newtonii (E)
São Tomé sunbird, Dreptes thomensis (E)
Olive sunbird, Cyanomitra olivacea

Weavers and allies
Order: PasseriformesFamily: Ploceidae

The weavers are small passerine birds related to the finches. They are seed-eating birds with rounded conical bills. The males of many species are brightly coloured, usually in red or yellow and black, some species show variation in colour only in the breeding season.

Príncipe golden-weaver, Ploceus princeps (E)
Southern masked-weaver, Ploceus velatus
Village weaver, Ploceus cucullatus (I)
Giant weaver, Ploceus grandis (E)
Black-headed weaver, Ploceus melanocephalus
São Tomé weaver, Ploceus sanctithomae (E)
Red-headed quelea, Quelea erythrops
Black-winged bishop, Euplectes hordeaceus
Golden-backed bishop, Euplectes aureus
White-winged widowbird, Euplectes albonotatus

Waxbills and allies
Order: PasseriformesFamily: Estrildidae

The estrildid finches are small passerine birds of the Old World tropics and Australasia. They are gregarious and often colonial seed eaters with short thick but pointed bills. They are all similar in structure and habits, but have wide variation in plumage colours and patterns.

Bronze mannikin, Spermestes cucullatus
Chestnut-breasted nigrita, Nigrita bicolor
Common waxbill, Estrilda astrild (I)
Southern cordonbleu, Uraeginthus angolensis (I)

Indigobirds
Order: PasseriformesFamily: Viduidae

The indigobirds are finch-like species which usually have black or indigo predominating in their plumage. All are brood parasites, which lay their eggs in the nests of estrildid finches. 

Pin-tailed whydah, Vidua macroura
Eastern paradise-whydah, Vidua paradisaea (I)

Old World sparrows
Order: PasseriformesFamily: Passeridae

Old World sparrows are small passerine birds. In general, sparrows tend to be small, plump, brown or grey birds with short tails and short powerful beaks. Old World sparrow are seed eaters, but they also consume small insects.

House sparrow, Passer domesticus (A)

Wagtails and pipits
Order: PasseriformesFamily: Motacillidae

Motacillidae is a family of small passerine birds with medium to long tails. They include the wagtails, longclaws and pipits. They are slender, ground feeding insectivores of open country. 

São Tomé short-tail, Motacilla bocagii (E)
Western yellow wagtail, Motacilla flava (A)
African pied wagtail, Motacilla aguimp
White wagtail, Motacilla alba (A)
Plain-backed pipit, Anthus leucophrys (A)
Tree pipit, Anthus trivialis (A)

Finches, euphonias, and allies
Order: PasseriformesFamily: Fringillidae

Finches are seed-eating passerine birds, that are small to moderately large and have a strong beak, usually conical and in some species very large. All have twelve tail feathers and nine primaries. These birds have a bouncing flight with alternating bouts of flapping and gliding on closed wings, and most sing well.

Yellow-fronted canary, Crithagra mozambica
Príncipe seedeater, Crithagra rufobrunnea (E)
São Tomé grosbeak, Crithagra concolor (E)

See also
List of birds
Lists of birds by region

References

 

 
Birds
Sao Tome and Principe
Sao Tome and Principe